Ecclesiastes 6 is the sixth chapter of the Book of Ecclesiastes in the Hebrew Bible or the Old Testament of the Christian Bible. The book contains philosophical speeches by a character called '(the) Qoheleth' ("the Teacher"), composed probably between the 5th and 2nd centuries BC. Peshitta, Targum, and Talmud attribute the authorship of the book to King Solomon. This chapter deals with wealth and insatiability.

Text
The original text was written in Hebrew. This chapter is divided into 12 verses. The Latin Vulgate translation has 11 verses, with the final verse carried over to the start of chapter 6.

Textual witnesses
Some early manuscripts containing the text of this chapter in Hebrew are of the Masoretic Text, which includes Codex Leningradensis (1008). Fragments containing parts of this chapter were found among the Dead Sea Scrolls 4QQoh (4Q109; 175-150 BCE; extant verses 1?, 3–8, 12).

There is also a translation into Koine Greek known as the Septuagint, made in the last few centuries BCE. Extant ancient manuscripts of the Septuagint version include Codex Vaticanus (B; B; 4th century), Codex Sinaiticus (S; BHK: S; 4th century), and Codex Alexandrinus (A; A; 5th century). The Greek text is probably derived from the work of Aquila of Sinope or his followers.

Wealth and its insecurity (6:1–6)
This section focuses on the theme of wealth, to whom God gives it and its trappings, that the rich may live long and have much, but may die unsatisfied and unmourned, while someone else would ultimately enjoy the riches; therefore, they are worse off than a stillborn child, which at least finds rest (verse 6).

Verse 3
If a man begets a hundred children and lives many years, so that the days of his years are many, but his soul is not satisfied with goodness, or indeed he has no burial, I say that a stillborn child is better than he.
The Jerusalem Bible (1966) and The Living Bible (1971) both suggest "as many daughters" as preferable translations in place of "lives many years". Retired Baptist minister Peter Pett suggests that, although Psalm 127 celebrates the blessing of many children, the number 100 should be interpreted as "a great many children, more than the norm".

Insatiable longing (6:7–9)
While people work to earn a living, Qoheleth argues that they are left unsatisfied because of the unanswered important questions: what is the point of wisdom, and what reason is there for the poor to find a role in life to improve one's lot? Verse 9 advises for contentment, because the desire to find answers beyond the obvious is seen as "vanity" (hebel).

Verse 7
All the labour of man is for his mouth, and yet the appetite is not filled.
The insatiability of desire is portrayed like "Sheol", the realm of death in the Hebrew Bible (cf. Isaiah 5:14; Habakkuk 2:5; Proverbs 27:20; 30:16).

An impasse (6:10–12)
This part starts a passage that ends in 7:13–14, insisting that 'no one knows what is good for humanity'.  Everything has been defined, so humans are inherently incapable of contesting a cause with the mightier one (verse 10).

Verse 10
Whatever happens, it has already been given a name,
and it is known what man is;
he cannot contend with Him who is stronger than he.
"Name" denotes 'character'. All have settled characters: the world (whatever happens/whatever exists), man and God (one who is stronger than he). 

See also
 Related Bible parts: Job 9

Notes

References

Sources

External links

 Jewish translations:
 Kohelet – Ecclesiastes - Chapter 6 (Judaica Press) translation [with Rashi's commentary] at Chabad.org
 Christian translations:
 Online Bible at GospelHall.org (ESV, KJV, Darby, American Standard Version, Bible in Basic English)
 Ecclesiastes Chapter 6 King James Version
  Various versions

06